Ayana Christiana Russell (born 16 March 1988) is a Trinidad and Tobago footballer who plays as a defender. She has been a member of the Trinidad and Tobago women's national team.

International career
Russell capped for Trinidad and Tobago at senior level during three CONCACAF Women's Championship editions (2010, 2014 and 2018), two Central American and Caribbean Games editions (2010 and 2018), the 2015 Pan American Games and the 2018 CFU Women's Challenge Series.

References

1988 births
Living people
Women's association football defenders
Trinidad and Tobago women's footballers
Trinidad and Tobago women's international footballers
Pan American Games competitors for Trinidad and Tobago
Footballers at the 2015 Pan American Games
Competitors at the 2010 Central American and Caribbean Games
Competitors at the 2018 Central American and Caribbean Games